Alfred Pearson (1850 - April 19, 1921) was an entrepreneur and politician who served as the 11th Mayor of Winnipeg.

Pearson was born in Bannington, Warwickshire, England and emigrated to Canada as a young adult. He settled in Winnipeg and started a general store with a business partner. In 1890, he was elected to mayor and served until 1891.

In 1892, he moved to Chicago and became a stockbroker.

He died in Los Angeles, where he had moved as a result of a bout of pneumonia.

References

External links
Manitoba Historical Society bio

1850 births
1921 deaths
Mayors of Winnipeg